The Secretary of the Democrats of the Left is the leader of the Italian Democrats of the Left political party.  The last Secretary since 2001 was Piero Fassino.

Secretaries of the Democrats of the Left 

Secretary